An urban mine is the stockpile of rare metals in the discarded waste electrical and electronic equipment (WEEE) of a society. Urban mining is the process of recovering these rare metals through mechanical and chemical treatments.

The name was coined in the 1980s by Professor Hideo Nanjyo of the Research Institute of Mineral Dressing and Metallurgy at Tohoku University and the idea has gained significant traction in Japan (and in other parts of Asia) in the 21st century.

Research published by the Japanese government's National Institute of Materials Science in 2010 estimated that there were 6,800 tonnes of gold recoverable from used electronic equipment in Japan.

References

Sources

Further reading 
 

Electronic waste
Mining
Recycling